The 2015 European Dressage Championships was held between August 12 and August 16, 2015 in Aachen, Germany. It formed part of the 2015 FEI European Championships; other disciplines included were jumping, reining and vaulting. It also served as a 2016 Olympics qualifier with team quotas in dressage awarded to the best three teams not already qualified nations.

The 2015 event was the 27th edition of the European Dressage Championships. This was the first European Dressage Championships held in Germany since 2005 and the first held in Aachen since 1983.

18 nations were scheduled to compete.

Summary 

The host country was Germany. The Netherlands and Great Britain maintained their domination of the sport. As all three nations had already qualified for the 2016 Games, the quota places went to Spain, Sweden and France. Spain won its first medal since 2005.

Medal summary

Medal table

Aftermath 
The Dutch coach of the dressage team Wim Ernes died on 1 November 2016. The gold medal winning dressage team at these championships Edward Gal, Hans Peter Minderhoud, Diederik van Silfhout and Patrick van der Meer carried his coffin during his funeral on 5 November 2016.

External links 
 Official web page of the 2015 European Dressage Championship

References 

European Dressage Championships
Dressage
Equestrian sports competitions in Germany
Sport in Aachen
European Dressage Championships
International sports competitions hosted by Germany